The 1928 Iowa State Teachers football team represented Iowa State Teachers College (later renamed University of Northern Iowa) as a member of the Iowa Conference during the 1928 college football season. In its fourth season under head coach Paul F. Bender, the team compiled an overall record of 5–1–3 with a mark of 4–0–2 in conference play, winning the Iowa Conference title.

Schedule

References

Iowa State Teachers
Northern Iowa Panthers football seasons
Iowa State Teachers football